Walid Iqbal is a Pakistani politician, lawyer, law professor serving as a member of Senate of Pakistan from Punjab, Pakistan and the Chairperson of the Senate Committee on Human Rights.

He is the grandson of poet and politician Allama Muhammad Iqbal, and the son of philosopher and former Senior Justice Javid Iqbal and judge Nasira Iqbal.

Education
After completing high school at Aitchison College in Lahore, Iqbal went to the United States  and received a bachelor's degree in economics from the Wharton School of the University of Pennsylvania in 1988. He received a Bachelor of Laws degree  from the University of Punjab in 1994 and a Master of Laws degree from Harvard Law School in 1997. He also has a Master of Philosophy degree from the University of Cambridge.

Legal career
Iqbal specialises in mergers and acquisitions, privatisation, corporate and project finance (particularly in the power sector), financial institutions, investment management, joint ventures, energy and petroleum, asset finance, information technology, telecommunications and software development, and corporate restructuring.

Between 1997 and 2004, he worked for two international law firms, Sullivan & Cromwell and Freshfields Bruckhaus Deringer. In January 2005, he returned to Pakistan and started his own law practice. He currently serves as an adjunct professor of business law at the Suleman Dawood School of Business, part of the Lahore University of Management Sciences (LUMS).

He is a member of the Securities and Exchange Commission of Pakistan and the Association of International Petroleum Negotiators (AIPN), and is on the board of directors of the Lahore Stock Exchange.

Bar memberships 
Advocate, Pakistan (1994)
Advocate, High Courts of Pakistan (1996)
State of New York (1998)
Roll of Solicitors of England and Wales (2004; currently non-practicing)

Political career 
Iqbal joined Pakistan Tehreek-e-Insaf in November 2011. He was the party's candidate for the National Assembly from the NA-124 (Lahore-VII) district in the 2013 election, but was defeated by Sheikh Rohail Asghar of PML-N.

He took oath as a member of the Senate of Pakistan representing Punjab, Pakistan on 14 December 2018. He served as the chairman of the Senate Committee on Defence from 2019 to 2021. He is currently serving as the chairman of the Senate Standing Committee on Defence.

References

Living people
Pakistan Tehreek-e-Insaf politicians
Politicians from Lahore
Waleed
Pakistani lawyers
University of the Punjab alumni
Pakistani people of Kashmiri descent
Punjabi people
Harvard Law School alumni
Wharton School of the University of Pennsylvania alumni
Alumni of the University of Cambridge
Academic staff of Lahore University of Management Sciences
Aitchison College alumni
Sullivan & Cromwell people
Year of birth missing (living people)